Chrysomela populi is a species of broad-shouldered leaf beetle belonging to the family Chrysomelidae, subfamily Chrysomelinae.

Distribution
This species is one of the most widespread and frequent species of leaf beetles from the subfamily Chrysomelinae. These beetles can be found in most of Europe (Austria, Belgium, Czech Republic, France, Germany, Italy, Luxembourg, Poland, Slovakia, Switzerland), in the Palearctic realm and in the Oriental realm (Caucasus, Pakistan, Siberia, Kazakhstan, Central Asia, Far East of Russia, China and Japan).

Habitat
These beetles mainly inhabit coniferous, mixed and broad-leaved forests, forest fringes and dry meadows with poplars and willow trees.

Description

Larva description
The larvae of the species is white or light grey coloured with black dots.

Adult description
Chrysomela populi can reach a length of about 9–13 mm. The female is slightly larger than the male. These beetles show a black, dark blue or dark green body, that is round and ladybird-like. Head and pronotum are black, while elytra is bright red, with a black stain at the base. Some beetles come as orange coloured.

It can be distinguished from Chrysolina grossa by its shorter antennae and less estensive pronotum. It is also rather similar to Chrysomela saliceti  and Chrysomela tremula.

Biology
Adults can be found from April to October. Females lay eggs in Spring, in small, irregular clusters of up to 20-30 eggs. This species has 2 to 3 generations per year. Larvae of the last generation overwinter in the litter under the leaves. Both the larvae and the beetles live and feed on young leaves of various plants of the Salicaceae species, especially Populus and willow species. Adults may emit a red, highly-smelling, repellent liquid, obtained from the salicylic acid  contained in their food plants.

Gallery

References 

Chrysomelinae
Beetles of Europe
Beetles of Asia
Beetles described in 1758
Taxa named by Carl Linnaeus